David Cushman (November 15, 1939 – August 14, 2000) was born in Indianapolis, Indiana. He was the son of Wayne B. and Mildred M.  and married to Linda L. Kranch.  They have two children together named Michael and Laura Cushman. Dr. Cushman  was an American chemist who co-invented captopril, the first of the ACE inhibitors used in the treatment of cardiovascular disease.  With Miguel A. Ondetti, he won the 1999 Lasker Award for: "developing an innovative approach to drug design based on protein structure and using it to create the ACE inhibitors, powerful oral agents for the treatment of high blood pressure, heart failure, and diabetic kidney disease."

Biography
In high school, Dr. Cushman didn’t have a drive or reason to succeed academically until he found a class he enjoyed because of the teacher. He went on to Wabash College in Crawfordsville, Indiana where he majored in Zoology and minored in Chemistry. His tenacious attitude gave him the boost to get magna cum laude. He was a first-generation college student in his family and grew up poor. He also stated that growing up poor is what made him strive for better, stating “being poor is a great stimulus for wanting to achieve something.”

After earning his Ph.D. in 1966 from the University of Illinois, Dr. Cushman joined the Squibb Institute for Medical Research.  His and Dr. Ondetti's research began with the Brazilian pit viper, one of the world's deadliest snakes.  Something in the venom inhibits angiotensin-converting enzyme (ACE), which helps regulate blood pressure. At first the idea of this drug was controversial and many believed that the drug would be ineffective. There were multiple instincts when people told them to quit. Despite that, Dr. Cushman, and Dr. Ondetti paid no attention to them and continued their research. Dr. Cushman even considered Zola Horovitz as a hero for is support.

Dr. Cushman says captopril's significance from a basic research point of view is that it was developed through pure chemical design. He credits Dr. John Vane with suggesting angiotensin converting enzyme as a target for research at The Squibb Institute. As Dr. Ondetti put it in an interview, "Capoten really was the first example of rational drug design based on a hypothetical biological mechanism." Dr. Cushman and Dr. Ondetti were not expecting as much publicity from discovering the captopril drug or the importance of the drug it was in that field. The captopril became available to the public in 1982 once the FDA viewed it. An issue that occurred was that the drug caused rashes when “very high doses of the drug” are given. It was stated that the captopril is “an oral drug that significantly reduces hypertension in more than eighty percent of users and has no side effects on the central or autonomic nervous systems.” Retired at 54 Dr. Cushman does many things in his free time like golfing, languages, and traveling around the world.

References 

1939 births
2000 deaths
American biochemists
Recipients of the Lasker-DeBakey Clinical Medical Research Award